Kawthoung District is a district of Tanintharyi Region of Myanmar. The district covers an area of 9,178 km2, and had a population of 221,738 at the 2014 Census.

Administrative divisions

Townships
The district contains the following townships:
Kawthaung Township (population: 81,718; 12.29/km2)
Bokepyin Township (population: 140,020; 55.41/km2)

Subtownships
 Karathuri Subtownship
 Khamaukgyi Subtownship
 Pyigyimandaing Subtownship

References

Districts of Myanmar
Tanintharyi Region